Esteban L. "Steve" Bovo Jr. (born June 12, 1962) is an American Republican politician from Florida and the current mayor of Hialeah, Florida. Bovo previously served on the Hialeah City Council, in the Florida House of Representatives, and on the Miami-Dade County Commission. He ran for mayor of Miami-Dade County in 2020, losing to Daniella Levine Cava. Prior to serving as an elected official, Bovo worked at the historic Hialeah Park as a marketing and advertising executive.

Early and personal life 
Bovo was born in Queens, New York  on June 12, 1962 to Marilyn and Esteban Bovo-Carás. His father was a member of the 2506 Brigade. He earned his Associate's degree in Business Administration from Miami-Dade Community College in 1983 and his Bachelor of Science degree in Political Science from Florida International University in 1987.

Bovo lived in the Village Green area prior to moving to the City of Hialeah. He is married to Viviana and has five children: Oscar, Bianca, Esteban, Sofia, and Alessandro.

Political career 

Candidate for Miami-Dade County Mayor

In October 2020, Bovo announced he was running for Miami-Dade County Mayor. Bovo later officially qualified as a candidate in June 2020.  Bovo and his colleague, Commissioner Daniela Levine Cava, received the top two spots in the Tuesday, August 18, 2020 primary. Bovo received 29.41% of the vote and Levine Cava at 28.62%. A runoff was held on November 3, 2020, in which Bovo received 46% to Levine Cava's 54%.

Sources
City of Hialeah Council 1998-2008
Florida House of Representatives Profile
Miami-Dade County Commissioner Esteban L. Bovo, Jr. Biography
Miami-Dade County Chairman's Report - 2017-2018

References

County commissioners in Florida
Republican Party members of the Florida House of Representatives
1962 births
American politicians of Cuban descent
Living people
Hispanic and Latino American state legislators in Florida